Sami Makarem (April 14, 1931 – August 21, 2012) was a Druze Lebanese scholar, writer, poet and artist; he was born in the village of Aitat in Aley district and is best known for his academic contributions in the fields of Islamic studies, Sufism, and Islamic history.
 
He obtained his bachelor's degree in literature and philosophy in 1954 and his master's degree in Arabic literature in 1957 from the American University of Beirut. In 1963, he achieved his PhD in Middle Eastern studies from the University of Michigan, where he taught the Arabic language and specialized in Islamic Batini studies.

Career

In July 1963, he returned to Lebanon, to teach Islamic thought at the Lebanese University. In 1964, he was appointed assistant professor at the American University of Beirut (AUB), teaching Arabic literature and Islamic thought.
In 1970, he was promoted to the rank of associate professor at the American University of Beirut (AUB), and then he was promoted to the rank of full professor to teach Arabic literature, Islamic thought and Sufism. In addition, he held twice the position of head of the Department of Arabic Literature and Near Eastern Languages: from 1975 until 1978 and from 1993 until 1996. He acted as a part-time professor at the Lebanese University from 1977 until 1981. Also, he was director of the Center of Middle Eastern Studies at the American University in Beirut, from 1975 until 1978.

Works
Professor Sami Makarem wrote over twenty five books mainly concerning the Islamic history and studies, Lebanese history and the Druze faith, in addition to a great number of articles in different specialized periodicals, and hundreds of art works.

Books

 Al-Shi'r al-'Arabi fi Lubnan Bayn al-Harbayn al-'Alamiyyatayn (Arab Poetry in Lebanon between the Two World Wars), 1957
Ash-Shafiya, an Ismaili Poem Attributed to Shihabeddin Abu Firas (Edition and Translation into English with Notes and Introduction by Sami Makarem),1966
 Shiraz Madinat al-Awliya' wash-Shou'ara, a Translation of A. Arberry's Shiraz Persian City of Saints and Poets, 1966
 Adwa' 'ala Maslak at-Tawhid (Lights on the Druze Faith), 1966
 Al-Islam fi Mafhum al-Muwahhidin (Islam in the Druze Understanding), 1970
 The Doctrine of the Ismailis, 1972
The Political Doctrine of the Ismailis; The Imamate, 1979
 Al-Hallaj,1989, New Edition, 2004Ashiqaat Allah (The loving "Saints" of God), 1994
Ash-Shaykh 'Ali Faris Waliyy min al-Qarn ath-Thamin 'Ashar (Shaykh Ali Faris, An eighteenth-century Druze saint) 1998
Lubnan fi 'ahd al-Umara' at- Tanukhiyyin (Lebanon Under the Tanukhid Emirs), 2000
 Al Taqiyya fil Islam (Dissimulation in Islam), 2004
 Al-'Irfan fi Maslak at-Tawhid (Mysticism in the Druze Faith), 2006

Poetry
In addition to his academic contributions in the fields of Islamic studies, Sufism, Islamic history, and his artistic contribution, he published three works of poetry: 
Mir'at 'ala Jabal Qaf (A mirror on Mount Qaf) (1996), 
Daw' fi Madinat ad-Dabab (A Light over the city of Mist) (1999) 
Qasa'ed Hubb 'ala shati' Mir'at (Love poems on the shores of a Mirror) (2004).

References

External links
Sami Makarem’s Official Website
Sami Makarem Biography

Lebanese Druze
American University of Beirut alumni
University of Michigan alumni
20th-century Lebanese poets
Lebanese artists
1931 births
2012 deaths
Academic staff of Lebanese University
21st-century Lebanese poets
Lebanese male poets
20th-century male writers
21st-century male writers